Al-Hasan ibn Makhlad ibn al-Jarrah was a senior official of the Abbasid Caliphate. Born a Nestorian Christian, he converted to Islam late in life, and served as secretary under Caliph al-Mutawakkil (r. 847–861). Under Caliph al-Mu'tamid (r. 870–892) he occupied twice the highest civil administrative office, that of vizier, first in 877 and again in 878/9. He was dismissed by the powerful regent, the Caliph's brother al-Muwaffaq, and exiled to Egypt and then Antioch, where he probably died in 882.

His son Sulayman also served thrice as vizier of the Caliphate.

Sources
 

9th-century births
882 deaths
Viziers of the Abbasid Caliphate
Converts to Islam from Christianity
Nestorians in the Abbasid Caliphate